The 1942 edition of the Sugar Bowl featured the Missouri Tigers and the  It was played at Tulane Stadium on New Orleans, Louisiana, on Thursday, 

Those who watched the game were concerned by the entry of the United States into World War II following the attack on Pearl Harbor, which had occurred less than four weeks earlier. Despite this, the bowl game was played on schedule on New Year's Day 1942.

The game was played in a cold, driving rainstorm. During the first quarter, a blocked Tigers punt, turned back by Fordham tackle Alex Santilli, led to a two-point safety being scored by defensive end Stanley Ritinski. Nearly a touchdown, the referee ruled that the ball was not under control until after Ritinski slid over 

As the rain continued, no further points were scored. The final score was Fordham 2, Missouri 0, the lowest possible combined point total for an untied American football game, which stands as a bowl game record for an untied game as of 2022 (there have been four scoreless ties).  Fordham also won the game without a single forward pass completion; their total yardage was 137 yards, all gained on the ground.

The radio broadcast of the game was carried by the NBC Blue Network.

Statistics

References

Sugar Bowl
Sugar Bowl
Missouri Tigers football bowl games
Fordham Rams football bowl games
Sugar Bowl
Sugar Bowl